Otis is a male given name derived from an English surname, which was in turn derived from Ode, a variant form of Odo and Otto. The name also has origins in the Ars Goetia, it is a variation of the name Botis. Otis is also a male nickname from Otieno, with its roots in the Luo tribe in Kenya.

People
Otis Armstrong (born 1950), American football player
Otis R. Bowen (1918–2013), American politician
Otis Chandler (1927–2006), American newspaper publisher
Otis Clay (1942–2016), American R&B and soul singer
Otis Davis (born 1932), American athlete
Otis Dudley Duncan (1921–2004), American sociologist
Otis Dozovic (born 1991), American professional wrestler
Otis Gibson (1826–1889), American missionary in China
Otis F. Glenn (1879–1959), American politician
Otis Grant (born 1967), Canadian boxer
Otis Grant (American football) (1961–2011), American football player
Otis Jackson Jr. (born 1973), American music producer and rapper
Otis King (1876–1944), British inventor
Otis Nixon (born 1959), American baseball player
Otis Polelonema (1902–1981), Hopi painter, illustrator, weaver, song composer, and educator
Otis Redding (1941–1967), American musician
Otis Rush (1934–2018), American blues guitarist and singer-songwriter
Otis A. Singletary (1921–2003), American historian and university administrator
Otis Skinner (1858–1942), American actor
Otis Smith (basketball) (born 1964), American basketball player
Otis Smith (American football) (born 1965), American football player and coach
Otis M. Smith (1922–1994), American judge
Otis Spann (1930–1970), American pianist
Otis Taylor (musician) (born 1948), American musician
Otis Taylor (American football) (1942–2023), American football player
Otis Tufts (1804–1869), American inventor
Otis Williams (born 1941), American singer, founding member of The Temptations
Otis Young (1932–2001), American actor

Fiction
Otis, fictional character in the movie Good Burger
Otis, fictional character and an associate of Lex Luthor in the films Superman and Superman II
Otis, fictional puppy in the film The Adventures of Milo and Otis
Otis Owl, a good friend of Jerry Bear from Pajanimals
Otis the Aardvark, a BBC puppet character
Otis Blake, fictional character in Scott Cooper's 2009 film, Crazy Heart
Otis Campbell, fictional character in the television series The Andy Griffith Show
Otis the Cow, fictional character in Nickelodeon's 2006 film, Barnyard, and its TV spin-off series, Back at the Barnyard
Otis B. Driftwood, fictional character played by Groucho Marx in the 1935 film A Night at the Opera; also a fictional character in the Rob Zombie films House of 1000 Corpses and The Devil's Rejects 
Otis Milburn, fictional character in the television series, Sex Education
Otis Otis, a vampire in Heather Brewer's book series The Chronicles of Vladimir Tod
Main character in the Otis film.
Otis is the nickname of a fireman in Chicago Fire
Uncle Otis in Paw Patrol

See also
Otis (surname)
Otis (disambiguation)
Ottis, a surname and given name
Nemo (name)

Given names
Masculine given names
English masculine given names